The 1998 Detroit Lions season was their 69th in the league. The team failed to improve upon their previous season's output of 9–7 and did not make a repeat playoff appearance, instead posting their third 5–11 mark in seven seasons. This was the last season Barry Sanders would play in the NFL.

Offseason

NFL Draft

Undrafted Free Agents

Personnel

Staff

Roster

Regular season

Schedule

Standings

Season summary

Week 1

Awards and Records 
Barry Sanders retired as the second leading rusher in NFL history.
 15,269 yards.
 109 touchdowns
 5.0 average per rush attempt

References 

Detroit Lions seasons
Detroit Lions
Detroit Lions